Curley's Atlas Hotel and Baths was a long-standing institution in Queens, New York City. The hotel was founded in 1876 by John J. Curley on the beachfront at present-day Beach 102nd Street, in the neighborhood now known as Rockaway Beach or "Irishtown". The hotel was moved to its larger longer-lasting site at Beach 116th Street (then known as Fifth Avenue) in 1900.

Curley's remained extremely popular well past World War II, and was mentioned in a comedy routine by George Carlin as the place where he was conceived.

The hotel was destroyed by fire on March 31, 1968. After the fire, the lot remained empty for forty years.

Sources
 Vincent Seyfried and William Asadorian, Old Rockaway, New York, in Early Photographs, Dover Publications, Mineola, NY, 2000.
 Kevin Boyle, Braving the Waves: Rockaway Rises and Rises Again, Rising Star Press, 2002.

References

External links
 

Hotels established in 1876
1876 establishments in New York (state)
1968 disestablishments in New York (state)
Burned hotels in the United States
Defunct hotels in New York City
Rockaway, Queens
Hotels in Queens, New York